There are at least 100 named mountains in Gallatin County, Montana.
 Alex Lowe Peak, el. 
 Amber Butte, el. 
 Apex Point, el. 
 Avalanche Spire Rock, el. 
 Bald Peak, el. 
 Baldy Mountain, el. 
 Big Horn Peak, el. 
 Black Butte, el. 
 Blacktail Mountain, el. 
 Boat Mountain, el. 
 Bozeman Beacon, el. 
 Bridger Peak, el. 
 Burnt Top, el. 
 Cameron Point, el. 
 Canary Bird Peak, el. 
 Center Hill, el. 
 Chestnut Mountain, el. 
 Cinnamon Mountain, el. 
 Coffin Mountain, el. 
 Cone Peak, el. 
 Crown Butte, el. 
 Divide Peak, el. 
 Drinking Horse Mountain, el. 
 Eaglehead Mountain, el. 
 Eaglehead Mountain, el. 
 Elephant Mountain, el. 
 Flaming Arrow Rock, el. 
 Flanders Mountain, el. 
 Fortress Mountain, el. 
 Francham Mountain, el. 
 Fridley Peak, el. 
 Garnet Mountain, el. 
 Grassy Mountain, el. 
 Green Mountain, el. 
 Grouse Mountain, el. 
 Grouse Mountain, el. 
 Hardscrabble Peak, el. 
 Hatfield Mountain, el. 
 Horse Butte, el. 
 Horsethief Mountain, el. 
 Hyalite Peak, el. 
 Jumbo Mountain (Gallatin County, Montana), el. 
 King Butte, el. 
 Kinor Peak, el. 
 Lava Butte, el. 
 Lemondrop, el. 
 Lincoln Mountain, el. 
 Lionhead, el. 
 Little Round Mountain, el. 
 Lombard Hill, el. 
 Lone Indian Peak, el. 
 Maid of the Mist Mountain, el. 
 Marble Point, el. 
 Monument Mountain, el. 
 Mount Baldy, el. 
 Mount Blackmore, el. 
 Mount Bole, el. 
 Mount Chipperfield, el. 
 Mount Chisholm, el. 
 Mount Ellis, el. 
 Mount Hebgen, el. 
 Naya Nuki Peak, el. 
 Nixon Peak, el. 
 Noon Mark, el. 
 Overlook Mountain, Montana, el. 
 Packsaddle Peak, el. 
 Palace Butte, el. 
 Palisade Mountain, el. 
 Pika Point, el. 
 Pine Butte, el. 
 Pomp Peak, el. 
 Ramshorn Peak, el. 
 Red Mountain, el. 
 Red Rock Mountain, el. 
 Redstreak Peak, el. 
 Ross Peak, el. 
 Round Mountain, el. 
 Ruby Mountain, el. 
 Rugged Mountain, location unknown, el. 
 Sacagawea Peak, el. 
 Saddle Peak, el. 
 Sage Peak, el. 
 Sandy Butte, el. 
 Sleeping Giant Mountain, el. 
 Snowslide Mountain, el. 
 Spire Rock, el. 
 Streamboat Mountain, el. 
 Storm Castle, el. 
 Sunshine Point, el. 
 Table Mountain, el. 
 Table Mountain, el. 
 Tepee Point, el. 
 The Mummy, el. 
 The Sentinel, el. 
 Timber Butte, el. 
 Twin Peaks, el. 
 Wheeler Mountain, el. 
 White Peak, el. 
 Wilson Peak, el. 
 Zade Mountain, el.

See also
 List of mountains in Montana
 List of mountain ranges in Montana

Notes

Gallatin